Mohamad Jaafar (born 7 June 1990) is a Syrian professional footballer who plays as a striker for Swedish club Vimmerby IF.

He was the top scorer of the 2006 AFC U-17 Championship, leading Syria to the 2007 FIFA U-17 World Cup for the first time.

Honours

Individual
 AFC U-17 Championship Top Scorer in Singapore 2006 (6 goals)

External links
 

Living people
1990 births
Syrian footballers
Association football forwards
Expatriate footballers in Jordan
Hutteen Latakia players
People from Latakia
Syrian expatriate footballers
Syrian expatriate sportspeople in Jordan
IFK Mora Fotboll players
Syrian Premier League players